Carpathonesticus avrigensis  is a species of araneomorph spider of the family Nesticidae. It occurs in Romania, where it was discovered in a cave. Only two specimens, a male and a female, are known.

Description
In both sexes, the prosoma is pale yellow with a faint pattern and the opisthosoma is gray with a faint pattern. The male specimen had a body length of 4.8 mm with a prosoma 2.5 mm long; the female specimen was 7.2 mm long with a prosoma length of 2.8 mm.

Original publication

References 

Nesticidae
Spiders described in 1982
Spiders of Europe